MAXQDA is a software program designed for computer-assisted qualitative and mixed methods data, text and multimedia analysis in academic, scientific, and business institutions. It is being developed and distributed by VERBI Software based in Berlin, Germany.

MAXQDA is designed for the use in qualitative, quantitative and mixed methods research. The emphasis on going beyond qualitative research can be observed in the extensive attributes function (called variables in the programme itself) and the ability of the programme to deal relatively quickly with larger numbers of interviews.

Products

MAXQDA Standard 
The standard version of MAXQDA for macOS and Windows offers tools for the organisation and analysis of qualitative data. This includes text, audio, image, video and bibliographical files as well as survey data, Twitter tweets or focus group transcripts. The data can be analysed in a four-screen window with the help of codes and memos. MAXQDA's visualisation functions and export options facilitate presentations. MAXQDA includes some quantitative data analysis tools (e.g. Mixed Methods tools).

MAXQDA Plus 
MAXQDA Plus is an extended version of MAXQDA and includes the MAXDictio module. MAXDictio can be used to create dictionaries, as well as to search and filter text files. Vocabulary and word frequency analyses can be used to support qualitative findings.

MAXQDA Analytics Pro 
MAXQDA Analytics Pro is the most advanced version of MAXQDA. Besides the MAXDictio module, it also integrates a comprehensive module for statistical analysis of qualitative data. The "Stats" module offers tools to statistically analyze MAXQDA project data or import and work with external quantitative data sets in Excel or SPSS.

MAXQDA Reader
The MAXQDA Reader makes it possible to read and search MAXQDA projects without owning a license. Projects cannot be edited.

Version history
 1989: MAX (DOS)
 2001: MAXqda (Windows)
 2003: MAXDictio (Add on for quantitative text analysis)
 2005: MAXMaps (Add on for visual mapping)
 2007: MAXQDA 2007 (Windows)
 2010: MAXQDA 10 (Windows)
 2012: MAXQDA 11 (Windows)
 2012: MAXApp for iOS (iOS App)
 2014: MAXApp for Android (Android App)
 2014: MAXQDA 11 (Mac OS X)
 2015: MAXQDA 12 (Universal for Windows and Mac OS X)
 2016: VERBI releases two new products: MAXQDA Base and MAXQDA Analytics Pro
 2017: MAXQDA 2018 (Universal for Windows and macOS)
 2019: MAXQDA 2020 (Universal for Windows and macOS)
 2022: MAXQDA 2022 (Universal for Windows and macOS)

Features of MAXQDA 2022
 Import of text documents, tables, audio, video, images, twitter tweets, surveys
 Data is stored in project file
 Reading, editing and coding data
 Paraphrasing
 Settings links from one part of a document to another
 Annotating data with memos
 Visualization options (number of codes in different documents etc.)
 Group Comparison
 Analyse code combinations
 Import and export demographic information (variables) from and to SPSS and Excel
 Import of online surveys from SurveyMonkey
 Import of web pages with the free browser add-on MAXQDA Web Collector
 Analyse of responses to survey questions
 Searching and tagging words
 Transcription of audio and video files
 Internal program media player
 Linking data with georeferences (*.kml)
 Tools for summarizing content                                                                         
 Code with Emoticons and Symbols                                                                                                                                                                         
 Export to text, excel, html, xml and special reports
 Create Frequency Tables and Charts
 QTT Workspace
 TeamCloud                                                                                                              
 User management
 Statistical analysis of qualitative data

See also
 Computer-assisted qualitative data analysis software

Literature
 Juliet Corbin and Anselm Strauss: Basics of Qualitative Research: Techniques and Procedures for Developing Grounded Theory, 3rd edition, 2008, SAGE Publications, Los Angeles, London, New Delhi, Singapore
 Ann Lewins and Christina Silver: Using Software in Qualitative Research: A Step-by-Step Guide, 2nd edition, 2014, SAGE Publications, Los Angeles, London, New Delhi, Singapore

References

External links
 

QDA software
Science software for macOS